The 2013–14 season was Queen of the South's first season back in the second tier of Scottish football and their first season in the newly established Scottish Championship, having been promoted as champions from the Scottish Second Division at the end of the 2012–13 season. Queens also competed in the Challenge Cup, League Cup and the Scottish Cup.

Summary

Queen of the South finished fourth in the Scottish Championship. Their league position qualified the club for the quarter final stage of the Scottish Premiership play-offs where they were defeated 4-3 on aggregate by Falkirk over two legs.

The club reached the third round of the Challenge Cup, the third round of the League Cup and the fourth round of the Scottish Cup.

Management
The club were managed by Jim McIntyre, alongside his assistant Gerry McCabe for the 2013–14 season, following the departures of Allan Johnston and Sandy Clark who left to become the new manager and assistant of Scottish Premiership side Kilmarnock. On 9 June 2014 McCabe left to become the new assistant manager at newly promoted Scottish Premiership side Dundee under Paul Hartley.

Results & fixtures

Pre season

Scottish Championship

Premiership play-offs

Scottish Challenge Cup

Scottish League Cup

Scottish Cup

Player statistics

Captains

Squad 
Last updated 10 May 2014

|}
a.  Includes other competitive competitions, including the play-offs and the Challenge Cup.

Disciplinary record
Includes all competitive matches.
Last updated 10 May 2014

Clean sheets
{| class="wikitable" style="font-size: 95%; text-align: center;"
|-
!width=15|
!width=15|
!width=15|
!width=150|Name
!width=80|Scottish Championship
!width=80|Other 
!width=80|League Cup
!width=80|Scottish Cup
!width=80|Total
|-
|1
|GK
|
|Calum Antell
|2
|2
|1
|0
|5
|-
|2
|GK
|
|Zander Clark
|9
|0
|0
|1
|10
|-
|3
|GK
|
|James Atkinson
|1
|0
|0
|0
|1
|-
|
|
|
! Totals !! 12 !! 2 !! 1 !! 1 !! 16

Top Scorers 
Last updated on 10 May 2014

Team statistics

League table

Division summary

Transfers

Players in

Players out

See also
List of Queen of the South F.C. seasons

References

Queen of the South F.C. seasons
Queen of the South